John Hornsby (born 3 August 1945) is an English former footballer who played in the Football League as a winger for Colchester United.

Career

Born in Ferryhill, Hornsby represented local club Evenwood Town prior to joining Colchester United in 1965. He made his debut on 21 August 1965 in a 1–0 defeat to Port Vale at Vale Park. He scored just one goal for Colchester in his 11 league appearances in the home fixture against Port Vale which resulted in a 3–0 victory to the U's. He made his final appearance in a 0–0 draw with Aldershot at Layer Road on 16 April 1966 before returning to County Durham to play for hometown team Ferryhill United and South Shields.

References

1945 births
Living people
People from Ferryhill
Footballers from County Durham
English footballers
Association football wingers
Spennymoor Town F.C. players
Colchester United F.C. players
South Shields F.C. (1936) players
English Football League players
Ferryhill Athletic F.C. players